Mette Margrethe Koefoed Bjørnsen (6 December 1920 – 29 March 2008) was a Danish author, conciliator and economist who was chair of the  from 1988 to 1992. She was appointed Knight of the Order of the Dannebrog in 1986 and was upgraded to Knight First Class in 1993.

Early life
Bjørnsen was born in Frederiksberg on 6 December 1920. She was the daughter of the civil engineer Hans Georg Koefoed and Frida Rigmor Harriet Heiberg Møller. Bjørnsen had two siblings and was raised in Lyngby, which is north of Copenhagen. After Bjørnsen's mother insisted that her children become more educated, she went to the University of Copenhagen and studied economics. She gained employment  but her studying was during the German occupation of Denmark. Bjørnsen gained her Master of Science degree in 1947; she had been attracted to law during her education.

Career
She began her career working in the mornings at Statistics Denmark and the afternoons at the Ministry of Foreign Affairs. Bjørnsen became employed in the statistics department of  through . In 1959, she became an education inspector at the Ministry of Trade's Supervision of the Business School. She was associate professor  and head of department of the department of history at the Danish Teacher Training College between 1971 and 1990. During this period, Bjørnsen also at the Royal Danish Naval Academy, was an external associate professor at the University of Copenhagen and also taught economics and statistics at the Niels Brock Copenhagen Business College. She also appeared on television from 1977 to 1978 to articulate what economics is to the general public.

In 1969, she became a member of the board at Statistisk Tiårsoversigt, and also of Arbejdernes Landsbank six years later. Until 1994, Bjørnsen was a member of the board of Kofoeds School and advised department of the Government of Denmark on the International Labour Organization until the late 1960s. Bjørnsen acted as a go-between in an agreement with sailors and shipowners in 1981 and mediated in the fields of banking and journalism. She became one of three state's three conciliators in 1982.

Bjørnsen was elected to serve a single term of the Gentofte local municipal council in 1982 after drawing up the cross-party list. That same year, she was appointed chair of Arbejdsmarkedets Tillægspension's Board of Representatives and Board of Directors and held the position until 1993. Bjørnsen was also chair of the board of Top Danmark Fonden from 1985 to 1990 and led the Education Committee for Special Workers between 1985 and 1993. She was appointed chair of the Conciliation Institution in 1988 and  she remained in the position until 1992.

She remained in the position until 1997. Up to the Treaty of Amsterdam, Bjørnsen worked for the Europe of Nations organisation. She was the author of multiple textbooks on economics, statistics and social studies, of which some have been incorporated into the education curriculum for primary and lower secondary schools and she conducted lectures in places such as at associations and schools. Bjørnsen was appointed Knight of the Order of the Dannebrog in 1986 and was upgraded to Knight First Class seven years later.

Personal life
She was firstly married to the Palle Mogens Flemming Holstei from 1950 to their divorce in 1953. They had one child. Bjørnsen remarried to Lieutenant Colonel Bjørn Bjørnsen on 10 November 1953. There were two children of the second marriage. On 29 March 2008, she died at the Craftsmen's Association's Nursing Home in Copenhagen.

References

1920 births
2008 deaths
People from Frederiksberg
20th-century Danish women
21st-century Danish women
20th-century Danish non-fiction writers
21st-century Danish non-fiction writers
University of Copenhagen alumni
Danish women writers
Danish non-fiction writers
Danish women economists
Danish women academics
Women non-fiction writers
Academic staff of the University of Copenhagen
Knights First Class of the Order of the Dannebrog